Neurot Recordings is an American independent record label founded by members of avant-garde metal band Neurosis in 1999. Gradually expanding, it has showcased a variety of artists including a number of sludge metal, post-rock, and noise bands.

Bands

 A Storm of Light
 Across Tundras
 Akimbo
 Amber Asylum
 Amenra
 Battle of Mice
 Bee & Flower
 Blood & Time
 Burial at Sea
 Christ on Parade
 Chord
 Corrections House
 Culper Ring
 Current 93
 DEAFKIDS
 Enablers
 FINAL
 Galloping Coroners
 Grails
 Grey Daturas
 Guapo
 Harvestman
 House of Low Culture
 Ides of Gemini
 Isis
 Scott Kelly
 KK Null
 Lotus Eaters
 Made Out of Babies
 MGR
 Nate Hall (musician)
 Neurosis
 OM
 Oxbow
 Red Sparowes
 Sabers
 Savage Republic
 Shrinebuilder
 Skullflower
 Tarantula Hawk
 Tarantel
 Tone
 Tribes of Neurot
 U.S. Christmas
 Ufomammut
 Vitriol
 Steve Von Till
 Yob
 Zeni Geva

See also
 List of record labels

External links
 

American independent record labels
Rock record labels
Psychedelic rock record labels
Experimental music record labels
Noise music record labels
Ambient music record labels
Heavy metal record labels
Doom metal record labels
Hardcore record labels